Ryo Asano (born 8 July 1963) is a Japanese windsurfer. He competed in the men's Division II event at the 1988 Summer Olympics.

References

1963 births
Living people
Japanese male sailors (sport)
Japanese windsurfers
Olympic sailors of Japan
Sailors at the 1988 Summer Olympics – Division II
Place of birth missing (living people)